The Volkswagen ID. series is a family of battery electric cars from Volkswagen (VW), built on the MEB platform (German: Modularer E-Antriebs-Baukasten; English: modular electric-drive toolkit) that is developed by the Volkswagen Group for a range of electric cars manufactured by its subsidiaries. Most of its production vehicles were adapted from several concept car models.

History and etymology 
The ID. series is the first series of electric cars from VW that are purpose built from the ground up to be electric vehicles. According to Volkswagen, ID. stands for "intelligent design, identity and visionary technologies".

Production models

Upcoming models

Concept vehicles

See also 
 Volkswagen Group MEB platform
 Toyota bZ series
 Mercedes-EQ

References 

Electric concept cars
ID. series